Soham Shah is a Bollywood movie director who is popularly known for directing the films Kaal (2005) and the movie Luck (2009).

Personal life
Shah is from Mumbai.

Career
Shah previously worked for Dharma Productions and producer Karan Johar but they have recently split ways. He is now working for  Kumar Mangat. He has also expressed an interest in directing Gujarati films.

Filmography

References 

Year of birth missing (living people)
Living people
Gujarati people
Film directors from Gujarat